Elonus is a genus of ant-like leaf beetles in the family Aderidae. There are about seven described species in Elonus in North America.

Species
These seven species belong to the genus Elonus:
 Elonus basalis (LeConte, 1855)
 Elonus chisosensis Werner, 1993
 Elonus excavatus Werner, 1993
 Elonus gruberi Gompel, 2017
 Elonus hesperus Werner, 1990
 Elonus nebulosus (LeConte, 1875)
 Elonus simplex Werner, 1993

References

Further reading

External links

 

Aderidae
Articles created by Qbugbot